RPS may refer to:

Societies 
 Royal Pharmaceutical Society, in the United Kingdom
 Royal Philharmonic Society, in the United Kingdom
 Royal Photographic Society, in the United Kingdom
 Racial Preservation Society, a defunct British pressure group

Schools 
 Ralston Public Schools
 Regina Public Schools
 Revere Public Schools
 Ridgewood Preparatory School
 Rutgers Preparatory School, New Jersey, US

Groups 
 Reform Party of Syria
 Rajasthan Police Service, India
 Swedish National Police Board

Measures 
 Requests per second, a measure of resource use 
 Rounds per second, the rate of fire of a firearm
 Revolutions per second

Systems 
 Reactor Protective System of a nuclear power plant

Companies and organizations
 Rising Pune Supergiant, Indian cricket team
 Roadway Package System, package delivery company which became FedEx Ground
 RPS Group, a consultancy in the United Kingdom

Other uses 
 Real People Slash, a type of real person fiction
 Receive packet steering of computing interrupts
 Record of Protected Structures in the Irish National Inventory of Architectural Heritage
 Regulated Product Submissions, US health standard
 Renewable portfolio standard of energy
 Rock paper scissors, a hand game
 Rock, Paper, Shotgun, UK video game blog
 Roket Pengorbit Satelit, RPS-01, an Indonesian satellite launcher family
 Role-playing shooter, a type of video game